Duško Kuliš (born 7 February 1960) is a Bosnian folk singer and songwriter. He released his music mostly on Jugoton and its successor, Croatia Records. He is married and has two children.

Discography

He released the following studio albums:

 "Nisu moje godine za tebe" (1983, Jugoton)
 "Priđi mi bliže" (1985, Jugoton)
 "Nemirna ljubav" (1987, Jugoton)
 "Kako ću bez tebe" (1988, Jugoton)
 "Ako jednom poželiš da odeš" (1990, Jugoton)
 "Ne zovi me u zoru" (1994)
 "Kaži nebo" (1995, Croatia Records)
 "Ne palite za mnom svijeću" (1996, Dammic)
 "Imaš li dušu" (1999, Croatia Records)
 "Megamix" (2000, Croatia Records)
 "SuperMegaMix" (2001, Croatia Records)
 "Umri muški" (2002)
 "SuperMegaMix" (2004, Croatia Records)
 "Otkopčano – Zakopčano" (2005, Croatia Records)
 "Eto pitaj pola grada" (2008, Croatia Records)
 "Nije srce na prodaju" (2009)

References

1960 births
Living people
People from Kreševo
Yugoslav male singers
20th-century Croatian male singers
Croatian folk-pop singers
21st-century Croatian male singers